Charlie Ware (9 July 1903 – 19 March 1984) was an Irish sportsperson.  He played hurling with his local club Erin's Own and was a member of the Waterford senior inter-county team from the 1920s until the 1940s.

References

Erin's Own (Waterford) hurlers
Waterford inter-county hurlers
Munster inter-provincial hurlers
Sportspeople from Cork (city)
1903 births
1984 deaths